Balfourodendron riedelianum, known as marfim in Portuguese, is a species of flowering tree in the rue family, Rutaceae. It is native to Argentina, Brazil, and Paraguay.

References

External links

riedelianum
Plants described in 1897
Trees of Argentina
Trees of Brazil
Trees of Paraguay
Endangered plants
Taxonomy articles created by Polbot